Scuderia is a streamliner dragster.

In 1963, Jack Williams' Vancouver, British Columbia–based drag racing team (Williams-Devine-McDougall) rebuilt Williams' old slingshot rail with a new aluminum body (painted in blue metalflake), with a very long, pointed nose, faired-in engine, and blue-tinted Lexan canopy over the cockpit. The car's front wheels were spoked  motorcycle wheels, the exhausts long "weed cutter"-style pipes (exiting horizontally, rather than vertically). 

The engine was a  Chrysler hemi with a front-driven Potvin supercharger.  Ron Lowe replaced Devine and McDougall. 

Scuderia made her debut at the 1963 NHRA Winternationals at Pomona, California in Top Gas, recording a best pass of 8.83 seconds at  before mechanical trouble sidelined her. She also won the "Best Appearing" award.

The car was retired in 1967.  In the 1980s, Scuderia made a comeback when Williams entered her in West Coast nostalgia drag races, crashing at Fremont.  He restored the car and returned to racing in the early 1990s.

Notes

Sources
Taylor, Thom.  "Beauty Beyond the Twilight Zone" in Hot Rod, April 2017, pp.30–43.

1960s cars
1980s cars
Drag racing cars
Rear-wheel-drive vehicles